Venus Bay may refer to:

 Venus Bay, South Australia, Australia
 Venus Bay, Victoria, Australia
 Venus Bay (New Zealand)